The Kilauea class ammunition ship is a class of eight United States Navy cargo vessels designed for underway replenishment of naval warships. The ships were constructed 1968–1972 and were initially commissioned naval ships, carrying a crew of naval personnel. At various dates 1980–96 these ships were decommissioned and transferred to the Military Sealift Command for civilian operation. They were eventually all replaced by the s.

References

External links 
The Kilauea class
Kilauea class

Auxiliary ship classes of the United States Navy
 Kilauea class ammunition ship
 Kilauea class ammunition ship
 Kilauea class ammunition ship
Auxiliary replenishment ship classes